Bugler is the name of a roll-your-own brand of tobacco and rolling papers. The Bugler brand was first introduced in the United States in 1932 by Lane Limited. Lane became a subsidiary of Scandinavian Tobacco Group in 2011. According to recent market surveys, Bugler is the #2 selling brand of rolling tobacco in the United States, competing heavily with the brand TOP.

Each pouch of Bugler includes 0.65 oz. tobacco and 32 cigarette papers.  Bugler differentiates itself from its chief competitors in that its tobacco consists of a premium "Turkish and domestic blend", which is similar to the same claim advertised by the higher-priced factory made brand Camel. Bugler has recently  changed their rolling papers from thick papers to a newer, thinner paper which is interleaved.  Bugler paper booklets are also sold individually as a stand-alone product.

See also
 List of rolling papers

Notes

Products introduced in 1932
Tobacco brands
Cigarette rolling papers